Wade Dooley (born 2 October 1957) is a former England rugby union international who played lock forward. He played for his country 55 times and was known as the "Blackpool Tower", as a result of being 6 feet 8 inches tall and a police officer with Lancashire Constabulary in Blackpool.

Dooley was born in Warrington, Northern England and played rugby league as a teenager, taking up rugby union aged 19. He played most of his career for Preston Grasshoppers, where he was nurtured by former England international and coach Dick Greenwood. He also had a brief spell with Fylde and with New Brighton F.C.

Dooley made his international debut on 5 January 1985 against Romania. He later established a second row partnership with fellow police officer Paul Ackford.

In 1987 he broke the cheekbone of Welsh player Phil Davies with a punch during a rough game in Cardiff.

Dooley went on the 1989 British Lions tour to Australia, playing in the final two test matches. He was also part of the England team that won back-to-back grand slams in 1991 and 1992.

Dooley also went on the 1993 British Lions tour to New Zealand, but left the tour to return home for the funeral of his father. He was replaced on the tour by the Leicester lock Martin Johnson, and decided to retire.

Since retirement, Dooley and his wife, Sharon, have run a tea room called Dizzy Ducks at Wrea Green.

External links 

 Planet-Rugby stat archive and bio
 Sporting Heroes
 Sporting Heroes 2
 Sporting Heroes 3
 Sporting Heroes 4
 Sunday Times article 21 March 2010

1957 births
Living people
British & Irish Lions rugby union players from England
British police officers
England international rugby union players
Fylde Rugby Club players
Lancashire County RFU players
New Brighton F.C. players
North of England Rugby Union team
Preston Grasshoppers R.F.C. players
Rugby union players from Warrington
Rugby union locks